The Little Gap Covered Bridge is a historic covered bridge located near Little Gap in Lower Towamensing Township, Carbon County, Pennsylvania. It was built about 1860, and is a 73-foot, Burr truss span crossing the Aquashicola Creek.  The bridge incorporates elements of the Howe truss in its construction.

A nearby restaurant, the "Covered Bridge Inn," takes its name from the bridge. In 2011, the bridge was damaged by a hit and run driver.

References

Covered bridges on the National Register of Historic Places in Pennsylvania
Bridges completed in 1860
Bridges in Carbon County, Pennsylvania
Covered bridges in Carbon County, Pennsylvania
National Register of Historic Places in Carbon County, Pennsylvania
Road bridges on the National Register of Historic Places in Pennsylvania
Wooden bridges in Pennsylvania
Burr Truss bridges in the United States